Eskandari baraftab (also Romanized as eskandari baraftab and eskandari baraftab; also known as eskandari baraftab) is a village in Zayandeh Rud-e Shomali Rural District, in the Central District of Faridan County, Isfahan Province, Iran. At the 2006 census, its population was 432, in 102 families.

References 

Populated places in Faridan County